Margaret M. Doud (sometimes known as M. M. Doud) (born May 29, 1943) is the mayor of Mackinac Island. Doud has served as the mayor since April 1, 1975, making her the second longest currently serving mayor in the United States, after Robert M. Blais of Lake George, New York.

Career 

On May 22, 2005, she was given special recognition for her service. This included a certificate of recognition by Senator Debbie Stabenow and a tribute by the State of Michigan and then-Governor Jennifer Granholm. She was also presented with a flag that was flown over the U.S. Capitol building by Fr. Jim Williams, the pastor of Ste. Anne's Church, on behalf of Congressman Bart Stupak.

As well as being the mayor, she managed the historical Windermere Hotel along with her mother, Jannette Doud, and now manages it full-time after her mother's death in 2015. She occasionally contributes to The Mackinac Island Town Crier, the island's local weekly, seasonal newspaper.

Notes

References 

1943 births
Living people
People from Mackinac Island, Michigan
Women mayors of places in Michigan
21st-century American women